Andri Kustiawan (born 06 August 1991 in Bandung, West Java), known as Andrew, is an Indonesian professional futsal player who currently plays for Indonesia Pro Futsal League club Bintang Timur Surabaya and the Indonesia national team.

Honours

Club 
Vamos Mataram

 Indonesia Pro Futsal League Champions: 2017, 2018

National team 

 AFF Futsal Championship Runner-up: 2019
 AFF Futsal Championship Third place: 2012, 2018

Individual 

 Indonesia Pro Futsal League Topscorer: 2013, 2016, 2018, 2019

References

External links 

 Andri Kustiawan on Bolalob
 Andri Kustiawan on Ortuseight

Indonesian men's futsal players
1991 births
Living people